The Journal of Experimental Nanoscience is a peer-reviewed scientific journal covering original (primary) research and review articles on all aspects of nanoscience. It is published bimonthly by Taylor & Francis. The editor-in-chief is Nick Quirke (Imperial College).

Scope 
The Journal of Experimental Nanoscience covers research in the experimental sciences related to nanotechnology and nanomaterials, in research areas such as biology, physics, chemistry, chemical engineering, electrical engineering, mechanical engineering, materials, pharmaceuticals, and medicine.

Abstracting and indexing 
Journal of Experimental Nanoscience is abstracted and indexed in:
 Chemical Abstracts Service
 Science Citation Index
 Web of Science
 Scopus
According to the Journal Citation Reports, the journal has a 2020 impact factor of 3.075.

References

External links 
 

Taylor & Francis academic journals
Publications established in 2006
English-language journals
Bimonthly journals
Nanotechnology journals